The Skipper Scrappy UAC-200 is an American homebuilt aerobatic biplane that was designed by WA Skipper of Greeley, Colorado, introduced in 1970. The aircraft was supplied in the form of plans for amateur construction, but plans seem to no longer be available.

Design and development
The aircraft features a biplane layout, a single-seat, fixed conventional landing gear and a single engine in tractor configuration.

The aircraft fuselage is made from welded steel tubing with the  span wings built from wood and the whole aircraft covered in doped aircraft fabric.

Operational history
By October 2013 three examples had once been registered in the United States with the Federal Aviation Administration, but only one remained currently registered.

In September 1997 a Scrappy UAC-200 was flown to third place in the International Aerobatic Club basic category at the East Coast Aerobatics Championships, held in Warrenton, Virginia.

Specifications (Scrappy UAC-200)

References

Scrappy UAC-200
1970s United States sport aircraft
Single-engined tractor aircraft
Biplanes
Homebuilt aircraft
Aerobatic aircraft